Henry W. Kozloski (December 15, 1927 – May 21, 2013) was a sportswriter known for his work with The Morning Journal of Lorain, Ohio. He served as the Cleveland Indians and Cleveland Browns beat writer.

Born and raised in Pennsylvania, Hank was the third of five children. His love of sports came early, despite losing his eye teeth in a football game. His family moved to Lorain, Ohio in 1939. He served in the military for three years, having enlisted right before high school graduation. He was a graduate of Lorain High School, Class of 1945-B.  Hank served with great pride in the Aleutian Islands. After his discharge, he attended Ohio University graduating with a journalism degree.  Shortly after, he found employment with the local paper in Lockport, NY. On one of his many trips home, he met Helen Bors. They were soon married, and in the late 1950s, returned to their hometown, where Hank took a job covering the sports beat for The Lorain Journal (now The Morning Journal.)

A dedicated and talented journalist, Hank first began covering the Cleveland Browns, but was reassigned to the Cleveland Indians. Hank traveled with the Indians to spring training camps and road trips from the 1960s to around 1980. He then covered a local news beat until his retirement in the early 1990s. An eloquent writer with an outgoing personality, Hank was comfortable with both players and front office people. He claimed Art Modell, Herb Score and George Steinbrenner amongst his cohorts, along with numerous baseball players, famous and not so famous.

Hank returned to the game when he became an Official Scorer for the MLB, and stayed in this capacity until approximately 2007, a year after his wife died. He scored two World Series games while in this position.

Hank succumbed to congestive heart failure on May 21, 2013.   He is buried next to his wife in Calvary Cemetery, Lorain, Ohio.

Personal life
Kozloski was born in Plains, Pennsylvania but moved to Lorain in 1939. He attended Lorain High School and served three years in the United States Air Force. After the service, he attended Ohio University.

Professional career
Kozloski worked for the Lockport, New York Lockport Union-Sun & Journal and Ashtabula, Ohio Star Beacon before settling with The Morning Journal. He later served as a scorekeeper for the Indians for 18 seasons and was a member of the Baseball Writers' Association of America. He was a founding member of the Lorain Sports Hall of Fame, served as president for a spell and was inducted there in 1996.

He also worked for the News-Herald.

He was referenced in dozens of books.

References

American sportswriters
1927 births
2013 deaths
Ohio University alumni